The Tahitian Football Federation is the governing body of football in French Polynesia. The Tahiti's men national football team is after Australia and New Zealand the 3rd most successful nation representing OFC. They won the 2012 OFC Nations Cup after playing the final vs New Zealand.

References

External links
  Official website
 Tahiti at the FIFA website.
 Tahiti at OFC site

Tahiti
Football in French Polynesia
Tahiti
Sports organizations established in 1989
1989 establishments in French Polynesia